Edward Leader (28 August 1882 – 22 April 1959) was a British hurdler. He competed in the men's 110 metres hurdles at the 1908 Summer Olympics.

References

1882 births
1959 deaths
Athletes (track and field) at the 1908 Summer Olympics
British male hurdlers
British male high jumpers
Olympic athletes of Great Britain
Place of birth missing
Olympic male high jumpers